Lapo may refer to:

People

Surname
 Arnolfo di Lapo
 Yahor Lapo (born 1982), modern pentathlete from Belarus

Given name
 Lapo De Carlo (born 1968), Italian sports journalist and presenter
 Lapo Elkann (born 1977), Italian businessman
 Lapo Gianni (died after 1328), Italian poet
 Lapo Pistelli (born 1964), Italian politician
 Lapo da Castiglionchio (1316–1381)

Other
 Lift Above Poverty Organization, Nigerian organisation